Adli El-Shafei (born 18 April 1919) was an Egyptian Davis Cup Team tennis player from 1946 to 1955. He played 32 matches for Egypt in Davis Cup. He is the father of Ismail El Shafei and grandfather of Adli El Shafei II.

External links
 

1919 births
Possibly living people
Egyptian male tennis players